Krishanti O'Mara Vignarajah (born 1979) is a Marshall Scholar and an immigration advocate serving as President and CEO of Lutheran Immigration and Refugee Service. Previously, Vignarajah served as Policy Director to former First Lady Michelle Obama.

Education and biography 
The second child of Elyathamby and Sothy Vignarajah, Krishanti Vignarajah has been called a prominent Maryland resident, and one of Maryland's "Top 100 Women" and "Top 50 Influential Marylanders" by The Daily Record. She and her brother Thiru Vignarajah arrived in the United States as young children when their parents fled civil war in Sri Lanka. At Yale College she earned  a B.S. in Molecular, Cellular and Developmental Biology, graduating magna cum laude and with Phi Beta Kappa honors; she also earned a Master's degree there in Political Science. She was a 2002 Marshall Scholar at the University of Oxford, where she received an M.Phil. in International Relations. She returned to Yale Law School, where she served on the Yale Law Journal.

Vignarajah is married to Collin O'Mara, president and CEO of the National Wildlife Federation. Their wedding was officiated by Senator Chris Coons of Delaware.   

In June 2020, Vignarajah went public with her breast cancer diagnosis. In an interview with The Baltimore Sun, she said, "My hope is to do my part to lift some of the stigma and anxiety that sits around breast cancer."

Career 
Back from college for a summer, Vignarajah worked  for Senator Paul Sarbanes. She has practiced law at Jenner & Block in Washington, DC; she has clerked for Chief Judge Michael Boudin on the U.S. Court of Appeals for the First Circuit, and has taught at Georgetown University as an adjunct.

She was a Senior Advisor at the U. S. Department of State under both Secretary Kerry and Secretary Clinton.

Working in Michelle Obama's office, Vignarajah focussed on issues "related to entrepreneurship, private sector investment, infrastructure, women's issues, engagement with youth and religious communities, climate change, and budget development and execution".

Vignarajah ran for governor of Maryland in the 2018 primary election, finishing fourth. She gained "some national attention" because had she won, "she would have been the first woman, immigrant or person of color to be elected governor in the state".

In 2019, she became president and CEO of the Lutheran Immigration and Refugee Service. During her tenure there, the refugee resettlement agency filed litigation against the Trump administration, challenging the legality of Executive Order 13888, which seeks to give state and local officials the authority to opt out of refugee resettlement in their jurisdictions. In an interview with NPR, Vignarajah described the policy as "cruel and shortsighted," and noted that "refugees that have been waiting to be reunited with their families for years may be forced to settle hundreds of miles away." Vignarajah also spoke out against the Executive Order in a Baltimore Sun OpEd entitled, "The courts should declare Trump's refugee order unconstitutional." The lawsuit has thus far resulted in a preliminary injunction against the policy, barring its implementation temporarily. In response, Vignarajah told NBC News, "This injunction provides critical relief. Those who have been waiting for years to reunite with their families and friends will no longer have to choose between their loved ones and the resettlement services that are so critical in their first months as new Americans."

Selected publications 

 "Afghan evacuees are stuck in legal limbo. Here’s how to help them." The Washington Post, March 23, 2022
 "How business leaders can help meet the needs of Afghan refugees" USA Today, December 9, 2021
"As the U.S. approaches withdrawal, our Afghan allies' lives must be prioritized" The Washington Post, June 6, 2021
 "Sohail Pardis was beheaded because the US didn't reward him for his service" CNN, July, 28, 2021
 "Don't leave ICE out of police reform, brutality and racism in immigration enforcement" Houston Chronicle, July 3, 2020
 "How The U.S. Can Fix The 'Humanitarian Emergency' At The Border" NowThis News, April 8, 2021
 "On World Refugee Day, a shameful U.S. record to confront" New York Daily News, June 20, 2020
 "USAID's mission is too important to politicize and obstruct" The Hill, November 15, 2020
 "Migrants in detention deserve dignity, sanitary conditions" The Atlanta Journal-Constitution, April 25,2020
 "Massive detention facilities for migrant youth are failing" Miami Herald, May 28, 2019
 "Family separation of migrant children allowed U.S. government to 'traffic in kidnapping'" The Baltimore Sun, October 26, 2020
 "Welcoming refugees is a matter of faith, economics, and freedom" Houston Chronicle, January 13, 2020.

References 

1979 births
Alumni of the University of Oxford
Chief executive officers
Immigration activism
Living people
Yale College alumni
Marshall Scholars
American people of Sri Lankan Tamil descent